Springall is an English surname. Notable people with the surname include:

Alejandro Springall, Mexican film director and producer
Charles Springall (1925–2006), English comedian, actor, writer, and singer
Diana Springall (born 1938), British textile artist
John Springall (1932–2020), British cricketer
Wayne Springall (born 1956), Australian rugby player

English-language surnames